is a Japanese manga series written and illustrated by Satoru Noda. It was serialized in Shueisha's  manga magazine Weekly Young Jump from August 2014 to April 2022, with its chapters collected in thirty-one tankōbon volumes. The story follows Saichi Sugimoto, a veteran of the early twentieth-century Russo-Japanese War, and his quest to find a huge fortune of gold of the Ainu people, helped by a young Ainu girl named Asirpa. The Ainu language in the story is supervised by Hiroshi Nakagawa, an Ainu language linguist from Chiba University.

An anime television series adaptation produced by Geno Studio aired with two seasons from April to December 2018. A third season aired from October to December 2020. A fourth season produced by Brain's Base premiered in October 2022. A live-action film adaptation has been announced. The manga has been licensed for an English-language release by Viz Media since 2016. The anime is licensed by Crunchyroll and Funimation.

By March 2023, the Golden Kamuy manga had over 24 million copies in circulation, making it one of the best-selling manga series. The manga won the 9th Manga Taishō in 2016 and the 22nd Tezuka Osamu Cultural Prize in 2018.

Synopsis

Background
Golden Kamuy takes place in the aftermath of the Russo-Japanese War, primarily in Hokkaido and the surrounding regions, detailing the many real-life political, technological and cultural developments of the era; several key parts of the series, such as the character Hijikata Toshizō, are fictionalized versions of real-life people and events. Specific focus is given to the indigenous Ainu people and their culture, such as exploring their language and the way they respectfully use all parts of nature to thank the Kamuy that they believe provide them. Later parts of the story also explore the different subcultures within the Ainu, and the hardships they suffered by being caught in Japanese-Russian territorial conflicts. The plot also explores the severe struggles of soldiers and war veterans, with moral ambiguity, survivor's guilt, honour, penance and virtue ethics being common themes.

The central MacGuffin comes from an in-universe tall tale of a gold discovery by a group of Ainu miners, said to have yielded 20 kan of gold that ended with one man murdering the others. Hiding the gold and racing to tell his comrades, the survivor was discovered and captured by Japanese authorities who falsely claimed his execution and hid him in Abashiri Prison, hoping to torture the location out of him. Hobbled and watched closely to stop him escaping or communicating with the outside world, the survivor tattooed many parts of a ciphered map onto his fellow prisoners, offering them a cut of the gold for sharing it with his comrades outside. Eventually recognizing but unable to read the code, the prison attempted to transport the tattooed men elsewhere, only for the convicts to overpower and kill their captors before scattering into the night.

Premise

Saichi Sugimoto, a veteran of the Battle of 203 Hill, works as a panner in Hokkaido in order to provide for the widow of his dead comrade. Sugimoto is approached by a drunk old man, who tells him a dubious legend of gold that can only be found by following a map of tattoos, ones located on a group of convicts who escaped Abashiri Prison. Laughing off the story as a tall tale, Sugimoto wakes the next day to find the old man pointing his gun at him, apologizing for saying too much. Overpowering the old man, Sugimoto pursues him into the woods, only to find him disemboweled by a bear and with a large map tattoo across his chest, back and shoulders. Saved from the bear by a young Ainu girl named Asirpa, Sugimoto realizes the story is true and suggests they recover the Ainu gold together; Asirpa is uninterested in the gold but wants vengeance for her father, one of the Ainu miners who was betrayed.

Examining the body, they realize the tattoos have seams, meaning that the prisoners were always intended to be murdered and skinned; due to her opposition to needless killing, Asirpa suggests they try to co-operate with prisoners they find by simply tracing their tattoos. Soon recruiting Shiraishi, an escape artist and tattooed convict, Sugimoto's group soon finds themselves in conflicts with First Lieutenant Tsurumi, the insane leader of the 7th Division, and Hijikata, who is touted as the last living samurai. Due to the significant allure of the gold, as well as the traitorous nature of multiple parties, each group routinely forms and betrays truces to prevent any one party collecting all tattoos and deciphering the map.

Media

Manga

Written and illustrated by Satoru Noda, Golden Kamuy was serialized in Shueisha's seinen manga magazine Weekly Young Jump from August 21, 2014, to April 28, 2022. Its 314 individual chapters were collected into thirty-one tankōbon volumes, released between January 19, 2015 and July 19, 2022. 

Viz Media announced that they licensed the manga at New York Comic Con 2016, and they have been releasing volumes in North America since June 2017.

Anime

The anime television series adaptation is produced by Geno Studio. It is directed by Hitoshi Nanba and written by Noboru Takagi, with music by Kenichiro Suehiro, art direction by Atsushi Morikawa, and CG direction by Yuuko Okumura and Yasutaka Hamada. Kenichi Ohnuki is adapting the character designs for animation, while Koji Watanabe designs firearms, Shinya Anasuma designs the props, and Ryō Sumiyoshi designs the animals. The series' opening theme, "Winding Road", is performed by Man with a Mission, and the ending theme, "Hibana", is performed by The Sixth Lie. Like with the manga, Hiroshi Nakagawa, an Ainu language linguist from Chiba University, works on the anime as an Ainu language supervisor.

The anime was announced in July 2017 in Weekly Young Jump, and aired for twelve episodes starting from April 9 to June 25, 2018, on Tokyo MX, ytv, STV, and BS11. Golden Dōga Gekijō, a series of 25-second animated shorts based on extras included in the Golden Kamuy manga volumes and Weekly Young Jump, is directed by Kenshirō Morii and produced at DMM.futureworks and W-Toon Studio. It premiered online on April 16, 2018.

At the conclusion of the first season broadcast, a second season was announced and aired from October 8 to December 24, 2018. The second season's opening theme, "Reimei", is performed by Sayuri and My First Story, and the ending theme, "Tokeidai no Kane", is performed by Eastern Youth.

On July 7, 2019, it was announced that the series will receive a third season. On March 13, 2020, it was announced that the third season would premiere in October 2020. The season aired from October 5 to December 21, 2020, for 12 episodes. The third season's opening theme, "Grey," is performed by Fomare, and the ending theme "Yūsetsu", is performed by The Sixth Lie.

On December 5, 2021, it was announced that the series will receive a fourth season. Brain's Base is producing the season, replacing Geno Studio. Shizutaka Sugahara is serving as the chief director, and Takumi Yamakawa is designing the characters. Noboru Takagi is returning to write the scripts. The season premiered on October 3, 2022. The opening theme, "Never Say Goodbye," is performed by ALI featuring Mummy-D, while the ending theme, "Subete ga Soko ni Arimasu You Ni," is performed by The Spellbound.

The first season of the series was released across three DVD and Blu-ray volumes in Japan, starting in July 2018; they had originally been planned to release starting in June, but were delayed one month to allow for improvements to the footage compared to the TV broadcast version. The Japanese home video volumes include the Golden Dōga Gekijō YouTube shorts, including episodes that are exclusive to the video release. An original video animation (OVA) based on the manga's "Barato" arc was released on DVD in a bundle with the manga's 15th Japanese volume on September 19, 2018. A second OVA was released with the manga's 17th Japanese volume on March 19, 2019. A third OVA based on the manga's "Monster" arc was released with the manga's 19th Japanese volume on September 19, 2019. A fourth OVA based on the manga's "Shiton Animal Record" arc was bundled with the 23rd manga volume on September 18, 2020.

The TV series is simulcast on Crunchyroll, and an English dub started streaming on Funimation starting on April 30, 2018. Crunchyroll streamed the third season in North America, Central America, South America, Europe, Africa, Oceania, the Middle East, and the Commonwealth of Independent States. Funimation streamed the third season with an English dub later.

Live-action film
On April 19, 2022, it was announced that a live-action film adaptation has been greenlit.

Reception

Manga
Golden Kamuy won the 9th Manga Taishō award in 2016. It was nominated for the 20th and 21st annual Tezuka Osamu Cultural Prize in 2016 and 2017; and won the 22nd in 2018 in the Grand Prize category. It was also nominated for the 40th Kodansha Manga Award in the general category; and for an Eisner Award for Best U.S. Edition of International Material—Asia. It was ranked second in the 2016 edition of the Kono Manga ga Sugoi! list for male readers. The series won the Social Impact Award at the 24th Japan Media Arts Festival in 2021. The series also won the Grand Prize at the 51st Japan Cartoonists Association Awards in 2022.

The British Museum in London used an image of the character Asirpa to promote The Citi Exhibition: Manga, which ran from May 23 to August 26, 2019.

Sales
Golden Kamuy had five million copies in print by April 2018. It charted on the Oricon Japanese Comics Rankings for the week of April 18–24, 2016, with volume seven placing eighth place. By June 2019, the manga had 10 million copies in circulation; over 17 million copies in circulation by August 2021; over 18 million copies in circulation by December 2021; over 22 million copies in circulation by June 2022; 23 million copies in circulation by September 2022; and over 24 million copies in circulation by March 2023.

Notes

References

Further reading

External links
  
  
 

2014 manga
2018 anime ONAs
2018 anime OVAs
Adventure anime and manga
Ainu in fiction
Anime and manga set in Hokkaido
Brain's Base
Comics set in Russia
Crunchyroll anime
Funimation
Historical anime and manga
Manga Taishō
Meiji period in fiction
Muse Communication
NBCUniversal Entertainment Japan
Seinen manga
Shueisha franchises
Shueisha manga
Tokyo MX original programming
Viz Media manga
Western (genre) anime and manga
Winner of Tezuka Osamu Cultural Prize (Grand Prize)
Yakuza in anime and manga